Pachygonidia subhamata is a moth of the family Sphingidae.

Distribution 
It is found from Brazil, Venezuela and Ecuador north through Central America (Panama, Costa Rica, Nicaragua, Honduras, Guatemala, El Salvador and Belize) to Mexico.

Description 
The wingspan is 62–75 mm. There is a grey-brown submarginal patch on the forewing upperside and two median transverse pinkish-buff bands on the hindwing upperside. These band are more or less shaded with brown and the pink tint is mostly not prominent.

Biology 
There are probably multiple generations per year.

The larvae feed on  Vitis tiliifolia.

References

Pachygonidia
Moths described in 1856